Angkola, or Batak Angkola, is an Austronesian language of Sumatra. It is spoken in South Tapanuli Regency and Padang Sidempuan.

References 

Batak languages
Languages of Indonesia